Emilio Wálter Álvarez Silva (10 February 1939 – 22 April 2010) was a Uruguayan football defender who played for Uruguay in the 1962 and 1966 FIFA World Cups. He also played for Club Nacional de Football.

He died in 2010, aged 71. His remains are buried at Cementerio del Norte, Montevideo.

References

External links

 

1939 births
2010 deaths
Uruguayan footballers
Uruguay international footballers
Association football defenders
Uruguayan Primera División players
Club Nacional de Football players
1962 FIFA World Cup players
1966 FIFA World Cup players
Burials at the Cementerio del Norte, Montevideo